Yang Kuei-mei (born 6 September 1959) is a Taiwanese actress and television host. She has had starring roles in Eat Drink Man Woman, Vive L'Amour, and The Hole.

Yang has received several awards and a lot of nominations for her acting. She was named Best Asian Actress at the 1999 Singapore International Film Festival for The Hole ("For the subtlety and sophistication of her performance in the role of a woman determined to hurdle the stresses of urban life"). She also won the Best Actress award at the 2004 Golden Horse Film Festival for her role in The Moon Also Rises. She won Golden Bell Awards Best Leading Actress in a Television Series for Heaven Loves Good Men in 1999.

Filmography

Film

Television series

Variety and reality show

Awards and nominations

References

External links

1959 births
Living people
Actresses from Taipei
Taiwanese Buddhists
Taiwanese film actresses
Taiwanese television actresses
20th-century Taiwanese actresses
21st-century Taiwanese actresses
Taiwanese television presenters